Río Cañas is a barrio in the municipality of Añasco, Puerto Rico. Its population in 2010 was 300.

History
Puerto Rico was ceded by Spain in the aftermath of the Spanish–American War under the terms of the Treaty of Paris of 1898 and became an unincorporated territory of the United States. In 1899, the United States Department of War conducted a census of Puerto Rico finding that the combined population of Río Cañas, Casey Arriba and Ovejas barrios was 1,257.

See also

 List of communities in Puerto Rico
 List of barrios and sectors of Añasco, Puerto Rico

References

External links

Barrios of Añasco, Puerto Rico